Chaves is a city and a municipality in the north of Portugal. It is 10 km south of the Spanish border and 22 km south of Verín (Spain). The population in 2011 was 41,243, in an area of 591.23 km2. The municipality is the second most populous of the district of Vila Real (the district capital, Vila Real, is 60 km south on the A24 motorway). With origins in the Roman civitas Aquæ Flaviæ, Chaves has developed into a regional center. The urban area has 17,535 residents (2001).

History

Artefacts discovered in the region of Chaves identify the earliest settlement of humans dating back to the Paleolithic. Remnants discovered in Mairos, Pastoria and São Lourenço, those associated with transient proto-historic settlements and castros, show a human presence in the Alto Tâmega dating to the Chalcolithic. The region has seen persistent human settlement since Roman legions conquered and occupied the fertile valley of the Tâmega River, constructing a nascent outpost and taking over the existing castros in the area. The settlement was located at the convergence of three important Roman roads: the Bracara Augusta, Asturica, and Lamecum that crossed the Roman Province of Gallaecia, linking Rome to the region's natural resources. It was a military centre known for its baths, which lasted until the 16th century. This civilization constructed protective walls to protect the local population; spanned the river with the bridge; promoted the baths (with its warm medicinal waters); exploited local mines and alluvial deposits and other natural resources. Its importance led to the urban nucleus being elevated to the status ofmunicipality in 79 AD, during the reign of the first Flavian Caesar, Titus Flavius Caesar Vespasianus Augustus. Its benefactor consequently influenced its toponymy, becoming known as Aquae Flaviae. Artefacts from the area around the Matriz church indicate that Aquae Flaviae's centre was located in this place, in addition to an ancient headstone showing gladiatorial combat.

Rome's hegemony lasted until the 3rd century, when, successively, the proto-Germanic tribes of the Suebi, Visigoths and Alani colonized the imperial settlements of Chaves. Wars between Remismund and Frumar followed over their claims to the throne, which almost completely destroyed the village (it was settled in favour of Frumar, who imprisoned Idácio, the notable Bishop of Aquae Flaviae). Ironically, the Romans were complicit in Aquae Flaviae's near destruction. Barbarian dominion lasted until the Moors invaded from North Africa, defeating the Visigoth King Roderic at the beginning of the 8th century.

In course, the name of Aquae Flaviae began to disappear, being supplanted by the more Hispanic-sounding Aquae Calidae.

Arab rule of the Iberian peninsula forced many Christians to escape from Chaves into the mountains in the northwest. Battles between the Christians and Muslim forces then continued until the 11th century, when Alfonso V of León reconquered the territory. After finally defeating the last vestiges of Moorish influence, he reconstructed, settled and encircled the settlement of Chaves with walls, in addition to establishing a Jewish quarter in the community. It was in the reign of Afonso I of Portugal that it was taken from León and firmly integrated into the Kingdom of Portugal domain (1160). Owing to its geographic location (on Portugal's northern frontier with Spain), King Denis, ordered the construction of a castle to protect the kingdom's border.

During the reign of Afonso II, when the king continued to provoke the ire of the Papacy, Portuguese knights attacked the Galician tenancy of his half-brother Martin Sanches (who lived in the kingdom of Alfonso IX of León), possibly since the Bishop of Braga had estates in that region. Provoking Sanches to invade northern Portugal. The Leonese fought battles in Barcelos, Braga and Guimarães, where they defeated Portuguese forces, before retiring to Galicia with their spoils. At the same time, Alfonso IX of León seized Chaves, which remained in Leonese hands until the reign of King Sancho II, when he and Ferdinand III met in 1230/1231. This was likely a self-serving decision on Fernando's part, as he was fearful that Leonese barons would support Sancho against him. Alfonso IX continued to occupy Chaves as a method of ensuring his wife, Teresa, would be able to enjoy her properties in Portugal.

During the Portuguese Interregnum, the nobility of Chaves supported Beatrice of Portugal, as she was heir presumptive to King Ferdinand I, since he left no male heirs. The potential loss of independence of Portugal, through her marriage to John I of Castile resulted in the rebellion by the Master of the Order of Aviz (later King John I of Portugal), who would garner the support of the Portuguese Cortes, thus laying the seeds for his triumph at the Battle of Aljubarrota.  Yet, many nobles refused to break their oaths of fealty to Beatrice (including in Chaves), necessitating John's travel to Porto in force and scaring the nobles of Chaves and Bragança into capitulating.

The remnants of the Roman baths, and the houses used to assist the invalid, were demolished by the Count of Mesquitella at the end of the 17th century, in order to reinforce the defense of Chaves.

French forces invaded and attacked in 1807, during the Siege of Chaves, part of the Peninsular Wars. On 7 March 1808, Soult's forces invaded northern Portugal to remove British forces from Iberia. Brigadier Francisco Silveira was charged with the defense of Chaves, but his 6000 men were unable to support its defense, and quickly abandoned the castle. An attempt to defend Chaves by Francisco Pizarro was futile, and the city surrendered to French forces shortly after the engagement. With too many troops to imprison Soult released many under oath, in order to continue the attack on the main forces who had retreated to the south. But Francisco Silveira did not quit, and as the main French went on to defeat the Anglo-Portuguese alliance at the First Battle of Porto, Silveira retook Chaves.

On 20 September 1837, the Convention of Chaves, which followed the Battle of Ruivães and which ended Chartist or Marshall's Revolt, was signed in Chaves. Chaves was also a site of various religious apparitions, during the decade of 1830, eventually resulting in the construction of the Santuário da Nossa Senhora Aparecida.

On 8 July 1912, forces loyal to the former monarchy, under the command of Henrique Paiva Couceiro, confronted government forces, commanded by Colonel Ribeiro de Carvalho, during the second monarchist incursion.

On 12 March 1929, the town of Chaves was elevated to the category of city.

Geography

Physical geography

Chaves is in the extreme north of Portugal, bounded on the north by Galicia (Spain), on the east by the municipalities of Vinhais and Valpaços, on the south by the municipality of Vila Pouca de Aguiar and on the west by the municipalities of Montalegre and Boticas. Chaves is one of the six municipalities of the Alto Tâmega, situated in the district of Vila Real, strategically positioned in the northwest of the Iberian peninsula and accessed by important international highways.

The region is dominated by the Quaternary Chaves sedimentary basin, a graben aligned on a north-northeast to south-southwest orientation bounded by the Hercynian massif and metamorphic schistose formations. Mixed with the schistose complex, there are bands of graphitic slates, mainly in the southern part of the urbanized area of Chaves and south-east of Faiões. To the north, and into Galicia, the basin extends into the depression of the Verin Basin. One of the oldest formations in the region, it dates back to the Ordovician period ( between 488.3±1.7 to 443.7±1.5 million years ago), is composed of schist and graywacke deposits. During the Ordovician-Silurian geological periods quartzites and schists were formed, metamorphosed by Hercynian granitic intrusions, at the end of the Paleozoic.

The Alpine orogeny was the main cause of extensive tectonic activities and it was responsible for the formation of the hydrothermal field within the region. The Chaves graben was formed by the relative motion of the block with different types of sediments being settled. The most recent formations are a sedimentary series (lacustrine, alluvial, colluvial, detritic, etc.) with variable thickness that had their origin during the Miocene. Two main faults cross and influence the tectonic activities: the north-northeast by south-southeast Chaves-Verin Fault and a fault system crossing near Faiões and Santo Estêvão. The first fault developed from late Hercynian tectonic episode occurring between 280 and 300 million years ago, that developed into an almost north-south direction into the lithosphere. Intense neotectonic activity reactivated these old fractures, originating in a complex pattern of faults in the sedimentary basin.

Thermal springs
Mineral waters are the clearest evidence of these recent tectonic fractures. The Penacova-Régua-Verín Fault, is an active formation that extends longitudinally for 500 kilometres, intermingled with other faults resulting in subterranean hydrology. The thermal springs, principally those in Campilho and Salus Vidago (in Vila de Vidago) have developed from this mixture of circumstances. With temperatures reaching , these mineral springs (bicarbonates, sodium, silicates and fluoride) in the vicinity of the city of Chaves, have provided a potential source of income.

The hot springs were known since the Roman period, when the town was Aquae Flaviae; the Waters of Flavius were an important social gathering point, but fell into disuse as the town was slowly abandoned by attacks. The spas belong to a vast area of hydrothermal springs that stretch from Verín (in Galicia) to Pedras Salgadas, 30 km from Chaves (on the road to Vila Real). Despite its vastness and abundance of water, this thermal system is little utilized; of the nine groups of thermal springs there are only adequate installations in four of them: Chaves, Carvalhelhos, Vidago, Pedras Salgadas, and Verín. The modern spa industry in Chaves use these waters for numerous treatments, including stomach, liver, intestinal, and kidney ailments, through oral ingestion. Many small guesthouses in the old part of the town are dependent on the influx of these visitors. The thermal spas are located between the castle and the river, in front of a large area of grass-covered park with playgrounds and tennis courts.

Climate

Chaves has a Mediterranean climate (Köppen: Csa) with continental and oceanic influences.

The mountains between the Minho region and Trás-os-Montes serve as a climatic barrier and lessen rainfall closer to the interior. Winters can be cold; January highs rarely surpass  and lows are often below zero. Fog often hovers over the valley during the winter, usually lifting by midday, but on rare occasions can last for days. Cold fronts in the winter can often cause daytime temperatures to drop below . Snow is infrequent, especially in recent years although the surrounding hills often receive a dusting. Summer brush fires can often make this season unpleasant although in recent years they have diminished, perhaps because most of the forest cover has been burnt. Chaves is one of the few places in Portugal with a dry March.

Human geography
Government is administrated by the Municipal Chamber of Chaves, while locally the municipality is divided into the following parishes (freguesias):

 Águas Frias
 Anelhe
 Bustelo
 Calvão e Soutelinho da Raia
 Cimo de Vila da Castanheira
 Curalha
 Eiras, São Julião de Montenegro e Cela
 Ervededo
 Faiões
 Lama de Arcos
 Loivos e Póvoa de Agrações
 Maços
 Madalena e Samaiões
 Mairos
 Moreiras
 Nogueira da Montanha
 Oura
 Outeiro Seco
 Paradela
 Planalto de Monforte (Oucidres e Borbadela)
 Redondelo
 Sanfins
 Santa Cruz-Trindade e Sanjurge
 Santa Leocádia
 Santa Maria Maior
 Santo António de Monforte
 Santo Estêvão
 São Pedro de Agostém
 São Vicente
 Soutelo e Seara Velha
 Travancas e Roriz
 Tronco
 Vala de Anta
 Vidago, Arcossó, Selhariz e Vilarinho das Paranheiras
 Vila Verde da Raia
 Vilar de Nantes
 Vilarelho da Raia
 Vilas Boas
 Vilela do Tâmega
 Vilela Seca

Demographics

In the past 127 years, the municipality has seen a 29% increase in local population (from 31815 in 1864 to 40940 in 1991). This was not a gradual nor homogeneous increase, since there were periods of extreme growth or rapid decline. During the 20th century, growth after 1920 is notably influenced by the restriction of trans-Atlantic emigration, just like after 1991, the population decreases were associated with liberal emigration policies as a result of the Maastricht Treaty.

The parish populations have seen fluctuations, although the most recent census show that 31 of these agglomerations had population levels in 1991 much lower than their first tabulation. Further, analysis of the data identifies that the municipal increase (29%) was primarily from the more urbanized parishes, while peripheral rural/mountainous parishes show net decreases. Many of the local people have emigrated to settlements in northern Europe in addition to France, but commonly return or visit their villages for weddings or village festivals. Many residents of Chaves have also immigrated to  Connecticut and New Jersey in the United States. 

Chaves has been isolated from the coastal urban centers and has suffered from a lack of convenient road communications. Recently, a new four-lane highway (A24) was opened to traffic. It links Chaves to Vila Real, and to the border with Spain. In Vila Pouca de Aguiar the highway also connects with the A7 that leads to Porto.

City

The population of the city encompasses 17,535 residents in the parishes of Santa Cruz-Trinidade, Madalena, and Santa Maria Maior: these parishes form the urbanized population of the city of Chaves.

Although many of the older buildings outside the historical walls were demolished to make way for apartment blocks, the medieval quarter with its Rua Direita and Rua de Santo António have been declared historic zones.  In these areas there are narrow multi-story dwellings, whose origin has been limited by the walled city. Historically, the old quarter was the city, and few buildings were located outside its walls, since its frontier location and the imminent risk of invasion impeded the construction of homes outside the barriers. Consequently, space was limited and land primarily used for multi-purpose dwellings, resulting in very narrow streets and multi-story structures (with balconies that extend over the streets and protected the citizenry). Many of the lower floors were occupied by shops or small businesses, while the residents lived in the upper stories. Remnants of these verandas are still visible in the medieval quarter.

The walled city was at the forefront of the political turmoils during the Reconquista, transited by armies and sacked by enemies. Chaves was built, destroyed, and rebuilt several times by either faction (Christian and Muslim), when they occupied the castle (it is likely that for some periods the town was completely abandoned). In 1253, Afonso III supported the reconstruction of the castle. By 1258, Chaves was granted the status of a vila (or town).  While the walls were eventually rebuilt, the advent of artillery would make the castle's fortifications obsolete, and its importance waned, while the historical battlements fell into ruins.

On 15 November 2009 an extensive green space on the east side of the Tâmega River, between the Engenheiro Carmona Bridge and the Public Gardens, was opened to the public.  It is an area with playgrounds, pedestrian and cycling paths, a beach football pitch, and a large grassy area. A modern pedestrian bridge was constructed to link the park and recreational area with the hot springs on the west bank of the river.  At the same time cycling and walking paths were built on both banks of the river extending north for several kilometers. The pedestrian bridge, which is approximately 90 ft, is Chave's tallest and most expensive bridge.

Economy
Agriculture and services are still the main sources of income. The traditional prosperity of Chaves comes, mainly, from a highly fertile plain, nine kilometres long and three to five wide, referred to as the"veiga".  Since the land can be irrigated with canals there is intensive farming of potatoes, corn, rye, hay, while plots of vegetables are also commonplace in the local market.  The main canal begins near Vila Verde da Raia and crosses the valley on the right bank of the Tâmega as far as Nantes. On the whole, the land is made up of small plots that are rarely economically viable. There is some dairy farming, and a milk production unit on the south side of town, but few cows can be seen in the valley. In general most of the farmers are of retirement age and farming is often pursued more as a hobby than as a profession.

In addition to agriculture there are some small industries producing glass, tiles, and food products. Like Vila Pouca de Aguiar, located thirty kilometres south, this is a land of granite; there are several granite extraction and finishing industries located in Chaves, in addition to three brickworks, located on the south side of the city.  Further, two mineral water plants, located in Vidago, belong to the municipality.

Transportation
It is serviced by A24 motorway, which links Chaves with the south, to Viseu, Coimbra and Figueira da Foz, connecting to Vila Pouca de Aguiar by the A7 (which acts as the gateway to the southern Trás-os-Montes), and the N103 from Bragança to Braga.  Chaves is located 415 kilometres from Lisbon, 105 kilometres from Porto and just 55 kilometres from the district capital, Vila Real.

Between 1921 and 1990 Chaves was the northern terminus station of the Corgo line, a narrow gauge railway line which linked Chaves with Vila Real and Regua (the junction station for main line trains to Porto). The section between Chaves and Vila Real closed in 1990 and the remainder of the line closed in 2009.

Chaves Airport, a small, single runway airport for light aircraft, also serves the town.

Architecture

The town of Chaves is built upon a long military history, that includes many fortifications or vestiges of battlements. Apart from the medieval castle and 17th century forts (Forte de São Francisco andForte de São Neutel), two medieval fortifications still exist: Santo Estêvão Tower (in the village of the same name north of Chaves) and Monforte Castle (in the hills east of the town).

Prehistoric

 Bulideira Stone
 Castro of Alto do Vamba
 Castro of Curalha
 Castro of Muradal
 Castro of Outeiro dos Mouros
 Castro of Santiago do Monte
 Castro of Vale de Lagares
 Prehistoric Rock-Art Site of Bustelo
 Prehistoric Rock-Art Site of Eiras
 Prehistoric Rock-Art Site of Outeiro Machado

Civic

 Agrarian School of Alves Teixeira
 Agricultural Cooperative of Chaves
 Agricultural School of Chaves
 Bridge of Arco
 Bridge of Erdevedo
 Bridge of Guilherme
 Bridge of Meirinho
 Bridge of Missa
 Bridge of Ribela
 Bridge of Oura
 Bridge of Santiago
 Bridge of Trajan, a symbol of Chaves, the bridge was constructed during the reign of Emperors Vespasian and Trajan to span the Tâmega River and connect the Roman provincial towns of Astorga and Bracara Augusta, identifiable by columns, that identify the bridge and its dedication to Emperor;
 Caixa Geral de Depósitos 
 Cine-Theatre of Chaves
 Estate of Macieira em Casas Novas
 Forest Administration of Chaves
 Frontier Station of Vila Verde da Raia
 Fountain of Águas da Facha
 Fountain of Casa dos Montes
 Fountain of Castelões
 Fountain of Couto
 Fountain of Cruzeiro
 Fountain of Curalha
 Fountain of Lagoinha
 Fountain of Mina
 Fountain of Olmo
 Fountain of Povo de Castelões
 Fountain of Quinta de Humberto Teixeira
 Fountain of Santo António de Monforte
 Fountain of Santa Marinha
 Fountain of Vila Frade
 Hospital of the Santa Casa da Misericóridia
 Hospital of São João de Deus, also known as the Church of Madalena, this 18th century building was built during the reign of King John VI (his coat-of-arms appears on the main door), as a chapel and military hospital, but includes many Neoclassic and Baroque elements (including a high facade).
 Hotel-Palace of Vidago
 Kiln of Povo de Castelões
 Markers of Ervededo
 Manorhouse of Azeredo
 Manorhouse of the Braganzas
 Manorhouse of the Machados
 Manorhouse of the Montalvões
 Manorhouse of the Viscounts of Rosário
 Municipal Council of Chaves
 Municipal Council of Ervededo
 Municipal Stadium Eng. Manuel Branco Teixeira
 Palace of the Dukes of Braganza
 Pillory of Chaves
 Pillory of Erdevedo
 Pillory of Monforte
 Poldrado da Curalha
 Pombal de Vila de Frade
 Primary School Count Ferreira Chaves
 Primary School of Águas Ferias
 Primary School of Casas dos Montes
 Primary School of Casas Novas
 Primary School of Faiões
 Primary School of Loivos
 Primary School of Outeiro Jusão
 Primary School of Outeiro Seco
 Primary School of Santo António de Monforte
 Primary School of São Estêvão
 Primary School of São Lourenço
 Primary School of Selhariz
 Primary School of Vilar de Nantes
 Primary School of Vilarinho de Paranheiros
 Primary School of Vilela do Tâmega
 Railway Bridge of Tâmega
 Railway Station of Chaves
 Railway Station of Tâmega
 Railway Station of Vidago
 Residence of Abade de Baçal
 Residence of Bastos
 Residence of Meio do Povo
 Residence of Quinta da Mata
 Residence of Vilar de Nantes
 Roman Thermal Spa of Chaves
 Secondary School Dr. Júlio Dinis
 Watermills of Curalha

Military

 Castle of Chaves, classified as a Monumento Nacional since 22 March 1938, the 14th century castle was constructed in the reign of King D. Dinis, but today only the keep tower remains;
 Castle of Ervededo
 Castle of Mau Vizinho
 Castle of Monforte de Rio Livre
 Castle of Santo Estêvão
 Fort of São Francisco, plans for a hill fort had persisted since the Middle Ages, but this fort was only constructed following the Portuguese Restoration War, and saw service during the Napoleonic Invasion and Liberal Wars;
 Fort of São Neutel, built on a northern hill for a perceived possible Spanish invasion, during the Portuguese Restoration War, the fort was connected to the defensive line of Chaves.

Religious

In addition to the old Church of São Francisco (which for three centuries was resting place of the first Duke of Braganza), there are other buildings which have been artistically converted into hotel rooms, and which served the army as barracks for many years.

 Chapel of Espírito Santo
 Chapel of Granjinha
 Chapel of Nossa Senhora das Brotas
 Chapel of Nossa Senhora da Conceição
 Chapel of Nossa Senhora das Dores
 Chapel of Nossa Senhora da Encarnação
 Chapel of Nossa Senhora da Lapa
 Chapel of Nossa Senhora do Loreto
 Chapel of Nossa Senhora da Penha
 Chapel of Nossa Senhora da Piedade
 Chapel of Nossa Senhora do Pópulo
 Chapel of Nossa Senhora do Rosário
 Chapel of Nossa Senhora do Rosário de Sanjurg()
 Chapel of Pai Mogo
 Chapel of Santa Catarina
 Chapel of Santa Marinha
 Chapel of Santa Marta
 Chapel of Santo António
 Chapel of Santiago
 Chapel of São Bartolomeu
 Chapel of São Bento
 Chapel of São Bernardino
 Chapel of São Geraldo
 Chapel of São João Baptista
 Chapel of São Martinho
 Chapel of São Miguel
 Chapel of São Nicolau
 Chapel of São Roque
 Chapel of São Sebastião
 Chapel of São Simão
 Chapel of São Tiago
 Chapel of Senhor dos Aflitos
 Chapel of Senhor do Bom Caminho
 Chapel of Senhor do Calvário
 Chapel of Senhor dos Desamparados
 Chapel of Senhor dos Passos
 Chapel of Senhora de Livração
 Chapel of Senhora de Portela
 Church of Castelões
 Church of the Divino Salvador
 Church of Nossa Senhora da Assunção
 Church of Nossa Senhora da Assunção
 Church of Nossa Senhora da Azinheira
 Church of Nossa Senhora da Conceição
 Church of Nossa Senhora da Conceição
 Church of Nossa Senhora da Expectações
 Church of Nossa Senhora da Expectações
 Church of Nossa Senhora da Natividade
 Church of Nossa Senhora das Neves
 Church of Nossa Senhora das Neves
 Church of Nossa Senhora das Neves
 Church of the Sagrada Família
 Church of the Santa Casa da Misericórida, this 17th century Baroque church, was the main chapel of the Dukes of Bragança, that included four Greek columns and mythological sculptures, surmounted by an image of Nossa Senhora da Misericórdia, while the interior was covered in 18th century blue-and-white azulejo that depicted biblical scenes, while the wooden ceiling has a scene of the Visitation, painted by Jerónimo Rocha Braga (1743).
 Church of Santo André
 Church of Santo André
 Church of Santo António
 Church of Santo António
 Church of Santa Clara
 Church of Santo Estêvão
 Church of Santa Eulália
 Church of Santa Leocádia
 Church of Santa Luzia
 Church of Santa Maria
 Church of Santa Maria
 Church of Santa Maria
 Church of Santa Maria Maior, the 12th century Romanesque parochial church and former-cathedral (decommissioned when the bishopric was moved to Vila Real and abandoned after 716 A.D. during the Moorish invasion), was renovated in the 16th century, but the three nave church conserves many of the sturdy solid granite features and austere facade on the exterior and interior (such as the cylindrical columns supporting eight arches, a stone-ribbed dome covering the main chapel, stained glass and an unpainted oak ceiling).
 Church of Santa Marta
 Church of Santa Marta
 Church of Santiago
 Church of São Bartolomeu
 Church of São Bartolomeu
 Church of São Francisco
 Church of São Gonçalo
 Church of São Geraldo
 Church of São João Baptista
 Church of São Julião
 Church of São Martinho
 Church of São Miguel* Church of São Pedro
 Church of São Pedro de Sanfins
 Church of São Tiago
 Church of São Tiago
 Church of São Tiago
 Church of São Tomé
 Church of São Vicente
 Convent of São Francisco
 Cross of Calvão
 Cross of Eiras
 Cross of Lugar do Couto
 Cross of Nossa Senhora da Piedade
 Cross of Outeiro Seco
 Cross of Sanjurge
 Cross of São Bento
 Cross of São Sebastião
 Cross of Senhora da Piedade
 Cross of Senhora da Portela
 Cross of Vidago
 Cross of Vilela Seca
 Monastery of Nossa Senhora da Conceição
 Sanctuary of Alto do Coto
 Sanctuary of Nossa Senhora da Aparecida, constructed on the site of an 1833 Marian apparition, when three shepherd children (similar to the events in Fátima, Portugal) witnessed the Virgin Mary.
 Sanctuary of São Caetano, constructed in honour of Saint Cajetan (a Catholic Theatine orator from the Counter Reformation), it is the centre of annual (7 August) celebrations, when seven images of the saint are carried in religious processions.
 Sanctuary of Senhora de Engaranho, a sanctuary dedicated to an uncommon invocation to the image of Mary (responsible for aiding those with diseased-, crooked-/crossed-legs, or afflictions associated with walking, such as rickets), families with young children would visit the sanctuary and bathe their children in a carved granite stone with "miraculous waters". In addition to chapel to Our Lady of Necessities there are smaller shapels dedicated to St. Catejan, St. Blais and St. Benedict, and religious cross.

Notable citizens

 João Gonçalves da Costa, (PT Wiki) (1720–1820), an explorer and conquistador, he went to Brazil aged 16, conquering lands in the Sertão da Ressaca, (PT Wiki), fighting local native tribes, and founding the village of Vitória da Conquista, in the state of Bahia;

 Rodrigo de Sousa Coutinho, 1st Count of Linhares (1755–1812) a nobleman and politician.

 Inácio Luís Madeira de Melo (1775–1833) a military officer, served in the office of Governor of Arms, and led Portuguese troops based in Salvador, Bahia

 Agostinho de Sousa Pinto de Barros Cachapuz, (PT Wiki) (1786–1864), an officer during the Peninsular Wars and Liberal Wars, decorated for his defence of legitimist ideals;

 José Celestino da Silva (1849–1911) an Army officer, colonial administrator and governor of the colony of Portuguese Timor 1894-1908. 

 Manuel Maria Coelho (1857–1943) a military officer during the Portuguese First Republic. He became Prime Minister in 1921 after the Noite Sangrenta (Bloody Night)

 António Granjo (1881 – Lisbon, 1921), a lawyer and politician, assassinated as Minister of the Interior, during the infamous Noite Sangrenta (Bloody Night);

 Fernando de Quintanilha e Mendonça Dias (1898-1992) member of the Portuguese Navy and a political and colonial administrator during the Estado Novo. Minister of the Navy from 1958 to 1968 and created the Hydrographic Institute.

 Francisco da Costa Gomes, ComTE, GOA (Chaves; 1914–Lisbon 2001) a military officer, politician, the 15th President of the Portuguese Republic (the second after the Carnation Revolution), known for his brokered military agreement in Portuguese West Africa, and his refusal to swear public loyalty to the President of the Council of Ministers Marcello Caetano;

 Gentil de Valadares, (PT Wiki) (1916–Alvor 2006), a poet, known as the poet traitor during the Estado Novo regime for his work Coração against the Colonial Wars, and imprisoned by the PIDE (secret police);

 Mário Carneiro, (PT Wiki) (1917– 2008), a surgeon and director of the Caldas de Chaves; promoted a modern thermal park system in the Alto Tâmega region, that includes the Chaves spa;

 Nadir Afonso, GOSE (1920–2013) a geometric abstractionist painter, formally trained in architecture, became a pioneer in the Kinetic art movement;

 António Marto (born 1947) a  prelate of the Catholic Church, Bishop of Leiria-Fátima from 2006 to 2022, became a cardinal in 2018.

 Fernando Pereira (1950–1985), freelance photographer and Greenpeace activist, killed when French intelligence (DGSE) detonated a bomb and sank the Rainbow Warrior ship.

Sport 
 Carlos Manuel Pereira Pinto (born 1960) known as Adão, is a Portuguese former footballer with 410 club caps and 11 for Portugal
 Fernando Aguiar (born 1972) a Canadian former footballer with 395 club caps and 13 for Canada
 Vítor Castanheira (born 1977) a retired footballer with 351 club caps
 João Alves (born 1980) a retired footballer with 361 club caps and 3 for Portugal
 João Fernandes (born 1983) a footballer with about 350 club caps.

See also

 Aquæ Flaviæ
 Chaves IPR

External links

 Termas de Chaves - Official website of the thermal spa of Chaves
 Confraria de Chaves - Official website of the Confraria de Chaves that promotes cultural products from the region
 Grupo Desportivo Chaves

References

Notes

Sources
 
 
 
 
 
 

 
Cities in Portugal
Municipalities of Vila Real District
Populated places established in the 1st century